Pusiola is a genus of moths in the subfamily Arctiinae.

Species
Pusiola ampla (Debauche, 1942)
Pusiola aureola Birket-Smith, 1965
Pusiola celida (Bethune-Baker, 1911)
Pusiola chota (Swinhoe, 1885)
Pusiola curta (Rothschild, 1912)
Pusiola danella Durante & Panzera, 2002
Pusiola derelicta (Debauche, 1942)
Pusiola edwardsi (Kiriakoff, 1958)
Pusiola elongata (Aurivillius, 1910)
Pusiola fageli (Kiriakoff, 1954)
Pusiola flavicosta (Wallengren, 1860)
Pusiola hemiphaea (Hampson, 1909)
Pusiola holoxantha (Hampson, 1918)
Pusiola isabellina (Kiriakoff, 1954)
Pusiola leiodes (Kiriakoff, 1954)
Pusiola melemona (Kiriakoff, 1963)
Pusiola minutissima Kiriakoff, 1958
Pusiola monotonia (Strand, 1912)
Pusiola nigrifrons (Hampson, 1900)
Pusiola nyassana (Strand, 1912)
Pusiola occidentalis (Strand, 1912)
Pusiola ochreata (Hampson, 1901)
Pusiola poliosia (Kiriakoff, 1958)
Pusiola roscidella (Kiriakoff, 1954)
Pusiola sordidula (Kiriakoff, 1954)
Pusiola sorghicolor (Kiriakoff, 1954)
Pusiola squamosa (Bethune-Baker, 1911)
Pusiola straminea (Hampson, 1901)
Pusiola theresia (Kiriakoff, 1963)
Pusiola tinaeella (Kiriakoff, 1958)
Pusiola unicolor (Kiriakoff, 1954)
Pusiola verulama (Strand, 1912)

References

 Kühne, L. (2007). Esperiana Buchreihe zur Entomologie Memoir 3: 353-394.
 Natural History Museum Lepidoptera generic names catalog
 Wallengren (1863) Wien Ent. Monatschr. 4(2): 146.

Lithosiini
Moth genera